Naeem Sheth (born 25 May 1980) is a former Zimbabwean cricketer. Born in Umtali (now Mutare), he played one first-class match for Manicaland during the 2001–02 Logan Cup.

References

External links
 
 

1980 births
Living people
Cricketers from Mutare
Manicaland cricketers
Zimbabwean cricketers